Opium in Iran is widely available, and the country has been estimated to have the highest per capita number of opioid addicts in the world at a rate of 2.8% of Iranians over age 15. The Iranian government estimates the number of addicts at 2 million. Opium and heroin from Afghanistan and Pakistan—known collectively as the Golden Crescent—pass through Iran's eastern borders in large amounts.

Extent 
Total annual opium intercepts by the Iranian authorities are larger than in any other country. The Iranian government admits that they can only intercept a tiny proportion of the thousands of tonnes that are trafficked through Iran every year. Opium costs far less in Iran than in the West, and is cheaper than beer.

In Zahedan, an Iranian town near the Pakistani border, 3 grams of opium can be purchased for 10,000 Iranian rials, equivalent to less than ~$0.25 USD (based on an exchange rate of 42,000 IRR = US$1), and 1 kg costs the equivalent of ~$85. In Zabol, $1 buys 5 grams of Afghan opium.  According to official Iranian government reports, within Tehran the daily consumption of opium is 4 metric tons. According to UNODC estimates, 450 metric tons of opium are consumed in Iran each year.

See also
2010 Khorasan shootout
CIA transnational anti-crime and anti-drug activities
Crime in Iran
Golden Crescent
Health care in Iran
Illegal drug trade
List of countries by prevalence of opiates use
Opium production in Afghanistan

References

Drugs in Iran
Iran
Health in Iran